Justine Lord (born Jennifer Schooling; 8 March 1937) is an English actress, active on television throughout the 1960s.

She began her acting career in repertory theatre, and in the 1960s made guest appearances in “Live Now Pay Later” (1962)”,The Avengers ("Propellant 23", 1962), The Saint, ("The Bunco  Artists" and "The Saint Plays with Fire", 1963; "The Saint Steps In" and "The Imprudent Politician", 1964; "The Checkered Flag", 1965; The Fiction-Makers, 1968), The Prisoner ("The Girl Who Was Death", 1968) and Man in a Suitcase, as well as playing regular roles in Crossroads, Compact, The Troubleshooters and The Doctors.

Lord married James Ridler in 1971. She retired from acting in the late 1970s, with the exception of an appearance in The Young Ones in 1982.

Filmography

Film

Television

References

External links
 

Living people
People from Bromley
English television actresses
1937 births
Actresses from Kent